The Eurovision Song Contest 1994 was the 39th edition of the Eurovision Song Contest. It was the first time that any country had hosted the contest two years in a row. Organised by the European Broadcasting Union (EBU) and host broadcaster  (RTÉ), the contest was held at the Point Theatre on 30 April 1994. It was presented by Irish television and radio presenters Cynthia Ní Mhurchú and Gerry Ryan. This remains the last time that the contest has not been held in the month of May.

Twenty-five countries participated in the contest, equalling the record of the 1993 edition. A total of seven countries took part in the contest for the first time; Estonia, Hungary, Lithuania, Poland, Romania, Russia and Slovakia. To cope with the increasing number of countries wishing to participate in the contest, the EBU ruled that the seven lowest-placed countries from the preceding year's contest could not participate. Belgium, Cyprus, Denmark, Israel, Luxembourg, Slovenia and Turkey were therefore relegated based on these new rules. However, due to the withdrawal of Italy, Cyprus avoided relegation. Italy would not return to the contest until three years later. On the other hand, Luxembourg has not competed in the contest again ever since.

For the third time in a row Ireland won the contest with the song "Rock 'n' Roll Kids", performed by Paul Harrington and Charlie McGettigan, and written by Brendan Graham. Never before had a country won 3 times in a row in the history of the contest. At the same time, it was also a record sixth win, cementing Ireland as the country with the most wins in Eurovision history. Poland, Germany, Hungary and Malta rounded out the top five. Poland achieved the best result for a debut entry since 1957, and would remain as the record holder in that regard until 2007.

For the first time in Eurovision history, voting was done via satellite instead of by telephone, and as a result, viewers could see the spokespeople onscreen.

Location 

Ireland hosted the contest for the fifth time after winning the  contest in Millstreet. Dublin was chosen to be the host city, making it the fourth time that the Eurovision Song Contest was staged in the Irish capital. For the first time, the venue for the contest was the Point Theatre located on the North Wall Quay of the River Liffey, amongst the Dublin Docklands.

Contest overview
The contest opened with a brief film starring Macnas, a popular street group celebrating Walpurgis Night, with a replica Viking longboat sailing through the river Liffey with stars floating in water, fireworks and various caricatures dancing around various central Dublin locations. The cameras then went live to the venue itself, where dancers dressed in white and wearing caricatured heads of well-known Irish figures, arrived on stage carrying European countries’ flags. The presenters entered the stage spectacularly from a bridge which descended from the roof of the theatre.

This year's video postcards had a literary theme, showing contestants reading, fishing and doing other activities around Ireland while others doing in a separate studio (i.e. singing their snippet from their songs, doing photoshoots and others). The stage, by Paula Farrell, was four times larger than the Millstreet stage, and its design which included a city scene of skyscrapers and video screens plus a backdrop of an ever-changing night sky was based upon the concept of what a futuristic Dublin might look like with one remaining constant being the river Liffey. The floor was painted with dark blue reflective paint to give a watery effect resembling Dublin bay.

During the dress rehearsal, Polish representative Edyta Górniak broke the contest's rules by singing her song in English. The dress rehearsal is the performance shown to the juries who would select the winner. Only six countries demanded that Poland should be disqualified, though the rules required thirteen countries to complain before Poland could be removed from the competition. The proposed removal did not occur and Poland went on to come 2nd in the contest, the highest placing that any country's debut song had ever achieved until 2007 (the winner in 1956 was Switzerland's second song of the night).

When the voting started, Hungary took the lead from the first six juries and were well ahead of all the other countries. However, Ireland powered their way through the score board ending up the winners with a 60-point lead over second-placed Poland.

The interval act was the first-ever performance of the Irish dancing spectacular Riverdance, a then-unknown Irish act which combines folk music with modern dance. After being featured in the contest, Riverdance became a global phenomenon, arguably even eclipsing the popularity of the winning song and remaining popular to this day.

Participating countries

Qualification
In order to allow new countries to participate in the contest, a relegation system was announced by the EBU in summer of 1993.

Conductors
With the exception of Ireland, each performance had a conductor who directed the orchestra. Ireland's Noel Kelehan, the musical director and a Eurovision veteran, conducted the songs from three countries, but not his home country's song.

 Anders Berglund
 Olli Ahvenlahti
 no conductor
 George Theofanous
 Frank McNamara
 Michael Reed
 Miljenko Prohaska
 
 Valeriano Chiaravalle
 Urmas Lattikas
 Noel Kelehan
 Anthony Chircop
 Harry van Hoof
 Norbert Daum
 Vladimír Valovič
 Tomas Leiburas
 
 Sinan Alimanović
 Noel Kelehan
 
 Josep Llobell
 
 
 Noel Kelehan
 Alain Goraguer

Returning artists

Participants and results

Detailed voting results 

Jury voting was used to determine the points awarded by all countries. The announcement of the results from each country was conducted in the order in which they performed, with the spokespersons announcing their country's points in English or French in ascending order. The detailed breakdown of the points awarded by each country is listed in the tables below.

12 points
The below table summarises how the maximum 12 points were awarded from one country to another. The winning country is shown in bold.

Spokespersons 
Each country nominated a spokesperson who was responsible for announcing, in English or French, the votes for their respective country. For the first time the spokespersons were connected via satellite rather than through telephone lines, allowing them to appear in vision during the broadcast. Spokespersons at the 1994 contest are listed below.

 
 Solveig Herlin
 Eileen Dunne
 Anna Partelidou
 Sigríður Arnardóttir
 Colin Berry
 Helga Vlahović
 Isabel Bahia
 Sandra Studer
 Urve Tiidus
 
 John Demanuele
 Joop van Os
 Carmen Nebel
 Juraj Čurný
 Gitana Lapinskaitė
 
 Diana Grković-Foretić
 Fotini Giannoulatou
 
 María Ángeles Balañac
 
 Irina Klenskaya
 Jan Chojnacki
 Laurent Romejko

Broadcasts 

Each participating broadcaster was required to relay the contest via its networks. Non-participating EBU member broadcasters were also able to relay the contest as "passive participants". Broadcasters were able to send commentators to provide coverage of the contest in their own native language and to relay information about the artists and songs to their television viewers. Known details on the broadcasts in each country, including the specific broadcasting stations and commentators are shown in the tables below.

Notes and references

Notes

References

Bibliography

External links

 

 
1994
Music festivals in Ireland
1994 in Ireland
1994 in music
1994 in Irish music
1994 in Irish television
1990s in Dublin (city)
April 1994 events in Europe
Events in Dublin (city)